Timothy Brian LaKose (born May 28, 1969) is an American college basketball coach who is currently head women's basketball coach at the Dominican University of California.

Early life and education
LaKose attended Northview High School in Covina, California, where he was a two-time honorable mention Los Angeles Times basketball all-star, as a junior in 1986 and senior in 1987. LaKose then attended California State University, Northridge and graduated with a bachelor's degree in kinesiology in 1991.

Coaching career
LaKose was assistant athletic trainer for California Lutheran University women's basketball. In the 1992–93 season, LaKose was junior varsity coach at Royal High School in Simi Valley, California. In July 1993, LaKose returned to Cal Lutheran to become women's basketball head coach. In eight seasons, LaKose had a 136–67 record with Cal Lutheran and led the Regals to five SCIAC titles and four NCAA Division III Tournaments.

LaKose then was head coach at Cal State Bakersfield from 2001 to 2011. During this time, Cal State Bakersfield moved up from Division II to Division I. He finished his tenure with a 211–87 record.

From 2011 to 2013, LaKose was head coach at San Jose State. In 2012, LaKose earned WAC Coach of the Year honors for turning around a program that had only 13 wins in the four years prior to an 11–19 record in the 2011–12 season. San Jose State posted another 11–19 record the following season but improved to 8–10 in WAC play. Citing personal reasons, LaKose suddenly resigned on August 30, 2013, just over a week into the 2013 fall semester. However, in 2016, the NCAA revealed that LaKose violated NCAA rules by conducting impermissible practices and allowed an academic non-qualifier to participate in practices.

In 2014, LaKose returned to coaching at the Dominican University of California, a Division II school in San Rafael. Dominican improved from 9–18 the previous season to 13–13 in LaKose's first season.

LaKose joined the Nicasio School District as a part-time physical education teacher in 2016.

Head coaching record

References

External links
Dominican bio
San Jose State bio
Cal State Bakersfield bio

1969 births
Living people
American women's basketball coaches
Basketball coaches from California
California Lutheran University alumni
California State University, Northridge alumni
Cal State Bakersfield Roadrunners women's basketball coaches
High school basketball coaches in California
San Jose State Spartans women's basketball coaches
People from Covina, California
Schoolteachers from California
Dominican Penguins